Gabe Sachs is an American television producer, who has been a writer/producer with partner Jeff Judah for a number of primetime television shows and movies including Freaks & Geeks, Just Shoot Me, Undeclared, Life As We Know It, 90210, What About Brian, and The Night Shift.  Sachs & Judah were also writers on the hit movies Diary Of A Wimpy Kid and Diary Of A Wimpy Kid: Rodrick Rules.

Life and career 
Sachs went to New York, got some friends together, and borrowed better equipment. The result was Street Match, a pilot entirely made on spec, which ABC picked up as a summer series. Soon after, Sachs shot his next show Pranks where he met his current writing/producing partner Jeff Judah. They wrote the pilot Damian Cromwell's Postcards From America under a deal at HBO and soon after Sachs & Judah was formed.

Sachs and Judah have been writing, producing and show-running for the past 18 years. On July 17, 2001, both Sachs and Judah through their Sachs/Judah Productions company had inked a deal with Studios USA.

Filmography

Film

Television 
The numbers in directing and writing credits refer to the number of episodes.

Acting credits

References

External links

American television producers
Place of birth missing (living people)
Year of birth missing (living people)
American web producers
Living people